Selagia spadicella is a species of snout moth. It is found in most of Europe (except Ireland, Great Britain, Portugal, Spain and Slovenia), as well as in Turkey and North Africa (including Morocco).

The wingspan is 23–28 mm. Adults are on wing from July to September.

The larvae feed on Calluna and Teucrium species.

References

Moths described in 1796
Phycitini
Moths of Japan
Moths of Europe
Moths of Asia